KickApps is a hosted platform for creating social networks and adding social software features, video players and widgets to websites. More than 100,000 sites use KickApps, including major media companies (e.g. NBC Universal, The BBC, H&R Block, and Scripps Networks) and a wide variety of niche websites.

The KickApps company was acquired in January 2011 by KIT digital.  
Then, in December 2012, the company was acquired again by Perfect Sense Digital.

Features
KickApps is a hosted platform (SaaS) that provides a range of social media applications to website developers and publishers.

A SaaS platform allows websites to deploy a wide range of user experiences in a variety of ways: REST and SOAP APIs, feeds, programmable widgets and video players, customizable templates and single-sign services.

 Members select a username and password (or use their existing site ID) to join your social network
 Members can upload videos, photos, and audio
 Member profiles contain standard social networking features, including: blogs (video, audio, and plain text), RSS feeds, guest books, friends, multi-media message boards, widgets and groups
 Includes online media management, member management, reporting and advertising administration

KickApps is often compared with Brightcove, Flux and Ning.

Founder and Chairman, Eric Alterman, was also founder of MeshNetworks (acquired by Motorola), Military Commercial Technologies, TeraNex, SkyCross, Jed Broadcasting, Quadfore, Centerpoint and Triton Network Systems

In January 2011, KickApps was acquired by KIT digital.

Venture Funding
 $7 million Series A round from Spark Capital and also included Prism VentureWorks and Jarl Mohn
 $11 million Series B round from SoftBank Capital and a group of previous investors
 $14 million Series C round from North Atlantic Capital and all previous investors.

References

Social networking services